Misuse of private information is a new common law tort that English courts recognised in Campbell v MGN Ltd. Arising as a branch of the law relating to breach of confidence, it has been reinforced by Article 8 of the European Convention on Human Rights, supplemented by s. 6 of the Human Rights Act 1998, which obliges public institutions (including the courts) not to act inconsistently with Convention rights.

Scope
Campbell was the watershed moment where the tort of "misuse of private information" became distinguished in scope from that relating to breach of confidence, as the former does not require "an initial confidential relationship." In addition, actions for misuse of private information can readily attract tortious damages, while those for breach of confidence may receive damages only as an equitable remedy within the discretion of the presiding judge.

While it will be obvious what may constitute public (as opposed to private) information in most cases, there will be times where it will need to be assessed as to whether disclosure of information would give substantial offence to an ordinary individual, as noted in Australia by Gleeson CJ in 2001:

As originally recognized in Campbell, a cause of action was restricted to disclosures of information or activities in which the plaintiff had a reasonable expectation of privacy. Expansion to include bare intrusions into privacy has been foreshadowed, such as where certain photographs are taken in a public place, however English courts are yet to definitively proscribe intrusions upon seclusion.

For example, an injunction against the Wolverhampton Express and Star was obtained in 2005 by an owner of several homes for troubled children to restrain it from disclosing plans for further homes, even though information was publicly available from searches of HM Land Registry records and unredacted minutes of local authority proceedings. In his judgment, Tugendhat J explained why, in this case, rights under Article 8 overrode competing obligations under Article 10 of the European Convention on Human Rights relating to freedom of expression:

Other Commonwealth jurisprudence
In addition to the Australian case law drawn upon by Campbell, there has been other jurisprudence arising in New Zealand and Canada. While the House of Lords followed the model previously adopted by the High Court of Australia, the other two jurisdictions based their approach  on the US Restatement of Torts (Second). It has been noted in Canada that the more principled approach adopted by the English courts post-Campbell may be a better one to follow.

See also
 Privacy law
 Canadian privacy law
 Privacy in Australian law
 Right to privacy in New Zealand

Further reading

References

Privacy law
English privacy law
English tort law
2004 establishments in England
2004 in law